Black Duck Creek is a stream in geographic Osborne Township in the Unorganized North Part of Nipissing District in Northeastern Ontario, Canada. It is in the Saint Lawrence River drainage basin, is a left tributary of the Jocko River, and lies entirely within Jocko Rivers Provincial Park.

Black Duck Creek begins at an unnamed bog next to the community of Osborne on the Ontario Northland Railway. It travels south adjacent to the railway, takes in one and then a second unnamed right tributary, and turns east. The creek takes in an unnamed left tributary, and reaches its mouth at the Jocko River, immediately after that river flows out of its source at Jocko Lake. The Jocko River flows via the Ottawa River to the Saint Lawrence River.

References

See also
List of rivers of Ontario

Rivers of Nipissing District
Tributaries of the Ottawa River